Allégresse is a French word for happiness

Music

Classical
Allégresse in C major Piano music of Gabriel Fauré
Allégresse and Rondo List of compositions by Carl Czerny
Allégresse and Barcarolle Mendelssohn
"Allégresse", composition for cello and piano by André Caplet (1903)
"L'allégresse", composition for organ by Charles Piroye
"Allégresse", composition for violin and piano Jean Gabriel-Marie (1894)
"Allégresse", composition by Saint-Preux
"Allégresse", composition by Jean-Jacques Grunenwald

Jazz
Allégresse (album) Maria Schneider 2000
"Allégresse", song by Maria Schneider composed by Maria Schneider from Allégresse (album)
"Allégresse", by :fr:Marc-André Pépin composed by Marc-André Pépin
"Allégresse", tune for accordion played by Charles Péguri composed by Roger Vaysse